NA-34 (Lower Dir) was a constituency for the National Assembly of Pakistan. It was split into NA-6 (Lower Dir-I) and NA-7 (Lower Dir-II) in 2018.

Members of Parliament

1977—2002: NA-34 (Lower Dir)

Since 2002: NA-34 (Lower Dir)

Elections since 2002

2002 General Election

A total of 2,072 votes were rejected.

2003 By-election

Qazi Hussain Ahmad won the general election in 2002 but he decided to take up the seat that he won in his native constituency, and thus vacated the seat. Therefore, in January 2003 bye-elections were held. The results are shown in the following table.

2008 General Election

A total of 2,746 votes were rejected.

2013 General Election

A total of 5,364 votes were rejected.

References

External links 
Election result's official website

Constituencies of Khyber Pakhtunkhwa